ISO 22320:2018,  Security and resilience - Emergency management - Guidelines for incident management, is an international standard published by International Organization for Standardization that provide guidelines to be used for organizations that helps to mitigate threats and deal with incidents to ensure continuity of basic function of society (for example water and food supplies, health, rescue services, fuel delivery, and electricity).  
ISO 22320 can be used by all types and sizes of organizations, no matter whether they are private or public but it is mostly focused on national emergency management organizations

Scope and contents 
ISO 22320 includes the following main clauses:
 Scope
 Normative references
 Terms and definitions
 Principles 
 Incident management 
 Working together
Annex A Additional guidance on working together 
Annex B Additional guidance on incident management structure 
Annex C Examples of incident management tasks 
Annex D Incident management planning

Related standards 
ISO 22320 is the first of a series of ISO standards and Technical Reports on Emergency management, including  
 ISO 22322:2022 Security and resilience  – Emergency management – Guidelines for public warning
 ISO 22324:2022 Security and resilience – Emergency management – Guidelines for colour coded alert
 ISO 22325:2016 Security and resilience – Emergency management – Guidelines for capability assessment
 ISO 22326:2018 Security and resilience – Emergency management – Guidelines for monitoring facilities with identified hazards
 ISO 22327:2018 Security and resilience – Emergency management – Guidelines for implementation of a community-based landslide early warning system
 ISO/TR 22351:2015 Societal security – Emergency management – Message structure for exchange of information

History 
This standard was originally developed by ISO technical committee ISO/TC 223 on societal security and published for the first time in November 2011.  
ISO/TC 292 Security and resilience took over the responsibility of the work when ISO/TC 223 was dissolved and initiated a revision of the standard.

See also 
 List of ISO standards
 International Organization for Standardization

References

External links 
 ISO 22320— Security and resilience - Emergency management - Guidelines for incident management 
 ISO TC 292—Security and resilience
  ISO 22320 at isotc292online.org

22320